Gaynor Anita Motley ( Flanagan, 10 January 1933 – 21 February 1999) was an Australian women's basketball player.

Biography
Flanagan played for the Australia women's national basketball team at the 1957 FIBA World Championship for Women, hosted by Brazil.  She married Geoff Motley, an Australian rules footballer inducted in the Australian Football Hall of Fame, and mother of Peter Motley who also played Australian football.

References

1933 births
1999 deaths
Australian women's basketball players
20th-century Australian women